Olloki is a village in Navarre (Spain). Until December 1, 2005 it was called a "concejo" —a sort of unincorporated area — when it joined Esteribar.

Municipalities in Navarre